The Adam and Eve cylinder seal, also known as the 'Temptation seal' is a small stone cylinder of Post-Akkadian origin, dating from about 2200 to 2100 BCE. The seal depicts two seated figures, a tree, and a serpent, and was formerly believed to evince some connection with Adam and Eve from the Book of Genesis. It is now seen as a conventional example of an Akkadian banquet scene.

History
Cylinder seals are small cylinders, usually made of stone and pierced from end-to-end. They are designed to be worn on a string or on a pin.

Designs are carved into the surface of cylinders seals in intaglio, so that when rolled on clay, the cylinder leaves a continuous imprint of the design, reversed and in relief. Cylinder seals originate from southern Mesopotamia (now Iraq) or south-western Iran. They were invented around 3500 BC, and were used as an administrative tool, as magical amulets and as jewellery until around 300 BC. They are linked to the invention of cuneiform writing on clay; when this spread to other areas of the Near East, the use of cylinder seals spread as well.

Assyriologist George Smith described the Adam and Eve seal as having two figures (male and female) on each side of a tree, holding out their hands to the fruit, while between the backs of the figures is a serpent, which he saw as evidence that the Fall of Man legend was known in early times of Babylonia.

Description
According to Dominque Collon, the seal shows a common scene found on seals from the twenty-third and twenty-second centuries BC: a seated male figure (identified by his head-dress of horns as a god) facing a female worshiper. The date palm and snake between them may merely be symbolic of fertility. This view is backed by David L. Petersen who writes that

References

Ancient Mesopotamia
Amulets

Middle Eastern objects in the British Museum
Adam and Eve